Heterocnephes delicata is a moth in the family Crambidae. It was described by Charles Swinhoe in 1917. It is found in Papua New Guinea.

References

Moths described in 1917
Pyraustinae